Serine protease HTRA2, mitochondrial is an enzyme that in humans is encoded by the HTRA2 gene. This protein is involved in caspase-dependent apoptosis and in Parkinson's disease.

Structure

Gene 
The gene HTRA2 encodes a serine protease. The human gene has 8 exons and locates at chromosome band 2p12.

Protein 
Protein HtrA2, also known as Omi, is a mitochondrially-located serine protease. The human protein Serine protease HTRA2, mitochondrial is 49kDa in size and composed of 458 amino acids. The peptide fragment of 1-31 amino acid is the mitochondrial transition sequence, fragment 32-133 amino acid is propertied, and 134-458 is the mature protein Serine protease HTRA2, mitochondrial, and its theoretical pI of this protein is 6.12. HtrA2 shows similarities with DegS, a bacterial protease present in the periplasm of gram-negative bacteria. Structurally, HtrA2 is a trimeric molecule with central protease domains and a carboxy-terminal PDZ domain, which is characteristic of the HtrA family. The PDZ domain preferentially binds C-terminus of the protein substrate and modulate the proteolytic activity of the trypsin-like protease domain.

Function 
The high-temperature requirement (HtrA) family are conserved evolutionarily and these oligomeric serine proteases has been classified in family S1B of the PA protease clan in the MEROPS protease database. The protease activity of the HtrA member HtrA2/Omi is required for mitochondrial homeostasis in mice and humans and inactivating mutations associated with neurodegenerative disorders such as Parkinson's disease. Moreover, HtrA2/Omi is released in the cytosol from the mitochondria during apoptosis and uses its four most N-terminal amino acids to mimic a caspase and be recruited by inhibitor of apoptosis protein (IAP) caspase inhibitors such as XIAP and CIAP1/2. Once bound, the serine protease cleaves the IAP, reducing the cell's inhibition to caspase activation. In summary, HTRA2/Omi contributes to apoptosis through both caspase-dependent and -independent pathways.

Clinical significance 
The members of the HtrA family of proteases have been shown playing critical roles in cell physiology and being involved in several pathological processes including cancer and neurodegenerative disease. Strong evidences supported of HtrA2's involvement in oncogenesis. This protein is widely expressed in a variety of cancer cell lines, Analysis of biopsy samples showed changes in expression of HtrA2 in cancer tissues compared with normal tissues.

HtrA2 has recently been identified as a gene related to Parkinson's disease. Mutations in Htra2 have been found in patients with Parkinson's disease. Additionally, mice lacking HtrA2 have a parkinsonian phenotype. This suggests that HtrA2 is linked to Parkinson's disease progression in humans and mice.

Interactions 
HtrA serine peptidase 2 has been shown to interact with MAPK14, XIAP and BIRC2.

References

Further reading

External links 
 The MEROPS online database for peptidases and their inhibitors: S01.278

Proteases
EC 3.4.21